The Primetime Emmy Award for Outstanding Variety Special (Pre-Recorded) is a category at the Primetime Emmy Awards. It is awarded annually to the singularly best pre-recorded varietal, musical or comedic special of the year. It was previously presented as Outstanding Variety Special until it was restructured alongside Outstanding Special Class Program for the 70th Primetime Emmy Awards.

The Kennedy Center Honors has won seven awards, including five consecutive wins from 2009 to 2013. It also won twice for Outstanding Variety Series when the two categories were combined.

Winners and nominations

1950s

1960s

Outstanding Variety or Musical Program

1970s

Outstanding Special – Comedy, Variety or Music

From 1979 to 1989, the category was combined as Outstanding Variety, Music or Comedy Program.

1990s
Outstanding Variety, Music or Comedy Special

In 1991, the category was combined as Outstanding Variety, Music or Comedy Program.

Outstanding Variety, Music or Comedy Program (Special)

Outstanding Variety, Music or Comedy Special

2000s

2010s

Outstanding Variety Special

Outstanding Variety Special (Pre-Recorded)

2020s

Notes

References

Variety Special (Pre-Recorded)